The 2012 European Tour was the fourth edition of the Race to Dubai and the 41st season of golf tournaments since the European Tour officially began in 1972. 

The season comprised 45 tournaments counting for the Race to Dubai, including the four major championships and four World Golf Championships, and one team competition. The season began in January with the Africa Open in South Africa, culminating with the DP World Tour Championship, Dubai in November. 

The Race to Dubai was won by Northern Ireland's Rory McIlroy, who also collected the Golfer of the Year award having also headed the PGA Tour money list and ascended to the top of the Official World Golf Ranking during 2012. Sir Henry Cotton Rookie of the Year was Portugal's Ricardo Santos.

Changes for 2012
Prior to the start of the 2011 season, the tour had announced their intention to realign the schedule with the calendar. As a result, in 2012 there were several changes from the previous season. There was initially one new tournament in 2012, the Perth International, and several tournaments were dropped: the Castelló Masters, the Iskandar Johor Open, and the Alfred Dunhill Championship, which was played in December as part of the 2013 season.

During the season, the BMW Masters in China was added to the schedule, the Czech Open was cancelled, and three tournaments in Spain were also cancelled: the Iberdrola Open, the Madrid Masters, and the Andalucía Masters.

Schedule
The following table lists official events during the 2012 season.

Unofficial events
The following events were sanctioned by the European Tour, but did not carry official money, nor were wins official.

Location of tournaments

Race to Dubai
Since 2009, the European Tour's money list has been known as the "Race to Dubai". It is based on money earned during the season and is calculated in euro, with earnings from tournaments that award prize money in other currencies being converted at the exchange rate available the week of the event.

Final standings
Final top 10 players in the Race to Dubai:

• Did not play

Awards

Golfer of the Month

See also
2012 in golf
2012 Challenge Tour
2012 European Senior Tour
2012 PGA Tour
List of golfers with most European Tour wins

Notes

References

External links
2012 season results on the PGA European Tour website
2012 Order of Merit on the PGA European Tour website

European Tour seasons
European Tour